Forest Hills Drive: Live is the first live album by American hip hop recording artist J. Cole. It was released on January 28, 2016 coinciding with Cole's 31st birthday, and recorded on August 30, 2015 live in Fayetteville, North Carolina.

Background

J. Cole: Road to Homecoming

On December 15, 2015, Cole announced a mini-documentary series titled, J. Cole: Road to Homecoming and released episode one the same day. Episode two was released on December 23. Episode three was released on December 30, Kendrick Lamar, Wale, ASAP Ferg and Rihanna made appearances. Episode four was released on January 6, 2016. All episodes were available for free on Vimeo until January 9.

Forest Hills Drive: Homecoming
Forest Hills Drive: Homecoming aired January 9, 2016, on HBO and HBO Now, and includes guest appearances from Jay Z, Drake, and Wale. The film took place during his Forest Hills Drive Tour at his fall 2015 show at the Crown Coliseum in Fayetteville, North Carolina. On January 28, 2016, Cole released the music video for "Love Yourz", which first premiered in the live concert film.

Commercial performance 
In his home country of United States, the album debuted at number 71 on the US Billboard 200 and number 11 on the Top R&B/Hip-Hop Albums. On the chart dated May 21, 2016 Forest Hills Drive: Live debuted at number 14 on the US Vinyl Albums chart.

Track listing

 "Intro (Live)" – 2:06
 "January 28th (Live)" – 6:55
 "Wet Dreamz (Live)" – 4:25
 "03' Adolescence (Live)" – 4:32
 "A Tale of 2 Citiez (Live)" – 4:44
 "Fire Squad (Live)" – 3:39
 "St. Tropez (Live)" – 7:47
 "Intermission (Live)" (includes "Lights Please", "In the Morning", & "Nobody's Perfect") – 6:50
 "G.O.M.D. (Live)" – 5:01
 "No Role Modelz (Live)" – 5:56
 "Hello (Live)" – 3:01
 "Apparently (Live)" – 4:46
 "Love Yourz (Live)" – 7:44

Personnel
Credits adapted from the liner notes of Forest Hills Drive: Live

 Juro "Mez" Davis – mix engineer
 DJ Dummy – DJ, music director
 Ron Gilmore – keyboard
 Irvin Washington – keyboard
 David Linaburg – guitar
 Carlin White – drums
 T. S. Desandies – background vocals
 Brittany Carter – background vocals
 Cedric Brown – stage manager
 Lashard Davis – props manager
 Jonathan Gilmore – lighting director
 Brandon Henderson – monitor engineer
 Raymond Rodgers – production manager, front of house engineer
 Tygrr Dosremedios – assistant production manager
 Chris Athens – master engineer
 Elijah Shaw – head of security
 KC Saney – tour manager
 Adam Rodney for Dreamville – creative manager
 Vlad Sepetov – photography
 Ryan Doubiago – photography
 Ibrahim Hamad for Dreamville – management

Charts

References

2016 live albums
J. Cole albums
Dreamville Records albums
Live hip hop albums